The 1987 Maine Black Bears football team was an American football team that represented the University of Maine as a member of the Yankee Conference during the 1987 NCAA Division I-AA football season. In their first season under head coach Tim Murphy, the Black Bears compiled a 8–4 record (6–1 against conference opponents), tied for the Yankee Conference championship, and lost to Georgia Southern in the first round of the NCAA Division I-AA Football Championship playoffs. Bob Wilder and Steve Violette were the team captains.

Schedule

References

Maine
Maine Black Bears football seasons
Yankee Conference football champion seasons
Maine Black Bears football